Han Seung-won (Hangul 한승원; born 1939) is a South Korean writer. He primarily writes about people who struggle against their fate in Jangheung, a county situated off the southern coast of the Korean peninsula where Han himself was born. Han's work tends to have a strong sense of place; his stories are often set in his coastal hometown and contain the local dialect.

Life 
Han Seung-won was born in Jangheung County, South Korea in 1939. He is a visiting professor of creative writing at Chosun University. He attended Jangheung Middle School, Jangheung High School, and Seorabeol Art University for creative writing. Han took a course taught by writer Kim Tong-ni and became acquainted with a number of classmates who went onto become writers, including Lee Mun Ku, Park Sang-ryoong, Cho Sehee, and Kim Won il. He made his literary debut in 1966 when he won the Shina Ilbo New Writer's Contest for his short story “Gajeungseureoun bada” (가증스런 바다 Despicable Sea). He began teaching at Jangdongseo Elementary School and has also taught at Kwangyang Middle School and Gwangju Dongshin Middle School.

Han's short story “Mokseon” (목선 Wooden Boat) won a writing contest by Daehan Ilbo in 1968, boosting his literary career. In 1972, he founded Soseol Munhak (“fiction and literature”), an association of writers based in Gwangju, South Korea. Members included Mun Sun-tae, Kim Sin-un, Kang Sun-sik, and Lee Gye-hong. He relocated to Seoul in 1980 and wrote full-time, producing bestsellers such as Aje aje bara-aje (아제아제바라아제 Aje aje bara-aje). The novel was made into a movie.

Over his 50-year career, he has persistently written stories inspired by the shores of his hometown. He moved back to Jangheung in 1997 and has resided there since. His two children, Han Kang and Han Dong-rim, are also writers. Both Han Seung-won and Han Kang have won the Yi Sang Literary Award and Kim Tong-ni Literary Award.

Writing 
Han Seung-won's works usually involve characters who are driven mad by desire and struggle against their tragic fate. While these characters express a deep sentiment of han, they are not entirely helpless against fate. Some destroy themselves in a fit of insanity, while others commit sins to fulfill their desires. They become trapped in a vicious cycle of suffering, reinforcing the theme of fate in Han's works.

One of Han's best-known works is the novella Hyebyeonui gilson (해변의 길손 Wanderer on the Shore), which is loosely based on an ancient Korean hero myth. The book spans decades from Japanese colonial rule through the chaotic post-liberation period to the Korean War, modernization, and finally the Gwangju Uprising in the 1980s. The turmoils of modern Korean history is reflected in the tragic life of the protagonist Hwang Du-pyo. In a storyline reminiscent of Cain and Abel, the novel centers around the conflict between Hwang and his little brother, who is smarter and more loved by their parents. Literary critic Wu Han-yong writes: “The tragedy of Hwang Du-pyo’s family originates from his inferiority complex and is correlated to Korean modern history; the tragedy of an individual expands into that of the nation. Another way to understand the novel is to focus on the psychology of its characters. In this kind of reading, one sees how Hwang’s bitter sense of inferiority grows as he experiences the tumults of history and how that compromises his integrity.”

Often set in his coastal hometown of Jangheung County, Han's stories have a strong sense of place. The language, people, and environment of his hometown feature heavily in his works. Han has described the sea as “the womb of the universe” and the source of his creative inspiration.

Works 
Fiction

1. 『앞산도 첩첩하고』, 창작과비평사, 1977.

Deep is the Mountain Before Me. Changbi, 1977.

2. 『바다의 뿔』, 동화출판공사, 1982.

Horns of the Sea. Donghwa, 1982.

3. 『불의 딸』, 문학과지성사, 1983.

The Daughter of Fire. Moonji, 1983.

4. 『그 바다 끓며 넘치며』, 청한문화사, 1983.

As the Sea Boils Over. Cheonghan Munhwasa, 1983.

5. 『아제아제 바라아제』, 삼성, 1985.

Aje aje bara-aje. Samsung, 1985.

6. 『우리들의 돌탑』, 문학과지성사, 1988.

Our Stone Tower. Moonji, 1988.

7. 『목선』, 시몬출판사, 1989.

Wooden Boat. Simon, 1989.

8. 『왕인의 땅』, 동광출판사, 1989.

The Land of Wani. Donggwang, 1989.

9. 『낙지같은 여자』, 지양사, 1991.

The Woman Like an Octopus. Jiyangsa, 1991.

10. 『아제아제 바라아제2』, 범조사, 1991.

Aje aje bara-aje 2. Beomjosa, 1991.

11. 『아제아제 바라아제3』, 범조사, 1991.

Aje aje bara-aje 3. Beomjosa, 1991.

12. 『내 고향 남쪽 바다』, 청아출판사, 1992.

The Southern Seas, My Hometown. Chunga, 1992.

13. 『새터말 사람들』, 문학과지성사, 1993.

People of the New Settlement. Moonji, 1993.

14. 『시인의 잠』, 문이당, 1994.

The Poet’s Sleep. Munidang, 1994.

15. 『아버지를 위하여』, 문이당, 1995.

For Father. Munidang, 1995.

16. 『목선:한승원 중단편전집1』, 문이당, 1999.

Wooden Boat: Short Stories and Novellas by Han Seung-won. Munidang, 1999.

17. 『아리랑 별곡:한승원 중단편전집2』, 문이당, 1999.

Arirang Song: Short Stories and Novellas by Han Seung-won 2. Munidang, 1999.

18. 『누이와 늑대:한승원 중단편전집3』, 문이당, 1999.

My Sister and the Wolf: Short Stories and Novellas by Han Seung-won 2. Munidang, 1999.

19. 『해변의 길손:한승원 중단편전집4』, 문이당, 1999.

Wanderer on the Shore: Short Stories and Novellas by Han Seung-won 4. Munidang, 1999.

20. 『내 고향 남쪽 바다:한승원 중단편전집5』, 문이당, 1999.

The Southern Seas, My Hometown: Short Stories and Novellas by Han Seung-won 5. Munidang, 1999.

21. 『검은댕기 두루미:한승원 중단편전집6』, 문이당, 1999.

Black-backed Crane: Short Stories and Novellas by Han Seung-won 6. Munidang, 1999.

22. 『화사』, 작가정신, 2001.

Flowering Serpent. Jakkajungsin, 2001.

23. 『초의』, 김영사, 2003.

Choui. Gimmyoung, 2003.

14. 『소설 원효(전3권)』, 비채, 2006.

Wonhyo: A Novel Vol. 1-3. Viche, 2006.

15. 『추사(전2권)』, 열림원, 2007.

Chusa Vol. 1-2. Yolimwon, 2007.

16. 『희망 사진관』, 문학과지성사, 2009.

Photo Studio of Hope. Moonji, 2009.

17. 『보리 닷 되』, 문학동네, 2010.

Five Dwe of Barley. Munhakdongne, 2010.

Poetry

1. 『열애 일기』, 문학과지성사, 1995.

Diary of Passionate Love. Moonji, 1995.

2. 『사랑은 늘 혼자 깨어 있게 하고』, 문학과지성사, 1995.

Love Always Keeps You Awake Alone. Moonji, 1995.

3. 『노을 아래서 파도를 줍다』, 문학과지성사, 1999.

I Picked Up a Wave Under the Sunset. Moonji, 1999.

4. 『달 긷는 집』, 문학과지성사, 2008.

The House That Draws Up the Moon. Moonji, 2008.

Works in translation 
1. Father and Son (English)

2. 塔 (Japanese)

3. 叶落彼岸 (Chinese)

Awards 
1. 2012: Suncheon Literary Award

2. 2006: Dongin Literary Award

3. 2002: Kiriyama Prize Notable Book Award

4. 2001: Hyundae Buddhist Literary Prize

5. 1997: Maritime Literature Award Grand Prize

6. 1994: Seorabol Literature Prize

7. 1988: Yi Sang Literary Award

8. 1988: Hyundae Literary Award

9. 1983: Korean Writer's Award

10. 1983: Korea Literature Prize

11. 1980: Korean Fiction Award

Further reading 
1. 이선영, ｢한승원의 ‘홀엄씨’에 대하여｣,《현대문학》, 1975. 7

Lee, Seon-yeong. “On Han Seung-won’s Widow.” Hyundae Munhak, July 1975.

2. 천이두, ｢한승원의 ‘홀엄씨’에 대하여｣,《월간문학》, 1975. 7

Cheon, I-du. “On Han Seung-won’s Widow.” Monthly Literature Magazine, July 1975.

3. 송재영, ｢한승원의 ‘석유 등잔불’에 대하여｣,《문학사상》, 1976. 12

Song, Jae-yeong. “On Han Seung-won’s ‘Oil Lamp.’” Monthly Literature & Thought, December 1976.

4. 김종철, ｢‘앞산도 첩첩하고’ 서평｣,《문학과지성》, 1977 가을

Kim, Jong-cheol. “Review of Deep Is the Mountain Before Me.” Literature and Intelligence, Fall 1977 Issue.

5. 오세영, ｢바다와 문학｣,《새어민》, 1977

Oh, Se-yeong. “The Sea and Literature.” Seeomin, 1977.

6. 이재선, ｢가면과 얼굴의 변증법｣,《문학사상》, 1978. 3

Lee, Jae-seon. “The Dialectic of Faces and Masks.” Monthly Literature & Thought, March 1978.

7. 이동열, ｢삭막한 삶의 형상화｣,《문학과지성》, 1979 여름

Lee, Dong-yeol. “The Image of a Bleak Life.” Literature and Intelligence, Summer 1979 Issue.

8. 정규웅, ｢감춰진 뜻｣,《창작과비평》, 1979 여름

Jeong, Gyu-ung. “Hidden Meaning.” Changbi, Summer 1979 Issue.

9. 이태동, ｢역사의 물결과 생명력의 흐름｣,《월간중앙》, 1979. 12

Lee, Tae-dong. “The Current of History and the Flow of Life.” JoongAng Monthly, December 1979.

10. 정현기, ｢무당굿과 소설가｣,《창작과비평》, 1979 겨울

Jeong, Hyeon-gi. “Shamanistic Rites and the Novelist.” Changbi, Winter 1979 Issue.

11. 송재영, ｢현실과 알레고리｣,《문학사상》, 1980. 2

Song, Jae-yeong. “Reality and Allegory.” Monthly Literature & Thought, February 1980.

12. 문순태, ｢한을 풀어 보려는 싸움｣,《여성동아》, 1980. 6

Mun, Sun-tae. “The Struggle Against Han.” W Dong-A, June 1980.

13. 김병욱, ｢자연의 이법과 인간의 삶｣,《한국문학》, 1980. 12

Kim, Byeong-uk. “Natural Laws and Human Lives.” Korean Literature, December 1980.

14. 김병욱, ｢자아의 탐색｣,《한국문학》, 1981. 2

Kim, Byeong-uk. “The Exploration of Self.” Korean Literature, February 1981.

15. 권영민, ｢삶․인간관계․기타｣,《한국문학》, 1981. 7

Kwon, Yeong-min. “Life. Relationships. Miscellaneous.” Korean Literature, July 1981.

16. 권영민, ｢토속성의 한계와 그 지양｣,《마당》, 1982. 12

Kwon, Yeong-min. “The Limitations and Transcendence of Locality.” Madang, December 1982.

17. 김  현, ｢억압과 저항｣, 『제3세대한국문학 3』, 삼성출판사, 1983

Kim, Hyeon. “Supression and Resistance.” In Third-Generation Korean Studies Vol. 3 (Samsung, 1983).

18. 김주연, ｢샤머니즘은 한국의 정신인가｣, 『불의 딸』, 문학과지성사, 1983

Kim, Ju-yeon. “Is Shamanism the Spirit of Korea?” In The Daughter of Fire (Moonji, 1983).

19 윤흥길, ｢모자로 쓰고 다니는 고향｣, 『제3세대한국문학 3』, 삼성출판사, 1983

Yun, Heung-gil. “Wearing One’s Hometown Around as a Hat.” In Third-Generation Korean Studies Vol. 3 (Samsung, 1983).

20. 권영민, ｢귀향과 이향의 변증법｣, 『포구』, 정음사, 1984

Kwon, Yeong-min. “The Dialectic of Leaving and Returning Home.” In Port (Jeongeumsa, 1984).

21. 이문구, ｢하백의 아들｣, 『현대의 한국문학 15』, 범한출판사, 1985

Lee, Mun Ku. “The Son of Habaek.” In Modern Korean Literature 15 (Bumhan Book, 1985).

22. 김재홍, ｢문명적 삶의 비극과 극복의 문제｣, 『현대의 한국문학 15』, 범한출판사, 1985

Kim, Jae-hong. “The Tragedy of Civilized Life and Overcoming It.” In Modern Korean Literature 15 (Bumhan Book, 1985).

23. 천이두, ｢토속성과 원시성｣, 『한국문학전집 26』, 삼성출판사, 1986

Cheon, I-du. “Locality and Aboriginality.” In Korean Literature Series 26 (Samsung, 1986).

24. 이동하 대 한승원, ｢문학논쟁｣,《동아일보》, 1986. 9. 12.

“Lee Dong-ha vs. Han Seung-won: A Debate on Literature.” Dong-a Ilbo, September 12, 1986.

25. 정현기, ｢혼돈의 동족상잔 혹은 근친상간｣,《한국문학》, 1987. 8

Jeong, Hyeon-gi. “A Chaotic Fratricide or Incest.” Korean Literature, August 1987.

26. 천이두, ｢다산성의 두 얼굴｣, 『한국대표문학전집 16』, 삼중당, 1988

Cheon, I-du. “The Two Faces of Fertility.” In Representative Korean Literature Series 16 (Samjungdang, 1988).

27. 이명재, ｢‘보수’와 혁신‘이 맞물린 부자간의 갈등｣,《동서문학》, 1988. 7

Lee, Myeong-jae. “Father vs. Son, or Conservative vs. Liberal.” Dongsuh Literature, July 1988.

28. 강은해, ｢도깨비 설화의 전통과 현대소설｣,《계명어문학》4, 1988

Kang, Eun-hae. “Dokkebi Myths and Modern Literature.” Keimyung Korean Language and Literature 4 (1988).

29. 김상태, ｢한승원론――패설 속의 신화｣,《문학사상》, 1988. 11

Kim, Sang-tae. “On Han Seung-won: The Myth in Folktales.” Monthly Literature & Thought, November 1988.

30. 이보영, ｢분단의 비극과 구원의 문제｣,《문학과사회》, 1989. 2

Lee, Bo-yeong. “The Tragedy of the Peninsula’s Division and the Issue of Salvation.” Literature and Society, February 1989.

31. 권영민, ｢한승원론――토속적 공간과 한의 세계｣, 『한국현대작가연구』, 민음사, 1989

Kwon, Yeong-min. “On Han Seung-won: Local Spaces and the World of Han.” In Criticism on Modern Korean Writers (Minumsa, 1989).

32. 최길성, ｢한국인의 한｣,《선청어문》18, 1989

Choi, Gil-seong. “The Han of Koreans.” Sancheong Language and Literature 18 (1989).

33. 정현기, ｢속죄의식 모티브의 소설적 표현｣,《매지논총》6, 1989

Jeong, Hyeon-gi. “The Motif of Atonement in the Novel.” Maeji Nonchong 6 (1989).

34. 이삼교, ｢삶과 역사의 진실을 찾아서｣,《금호문화》60, 1990

Lee, Sam-gyo. “Searching the Truth of Life and History.” Kumho Munhwa 60 (1990).

References

South Korean writers